Middlesex County Cricket Club was established on 2 February 1864; before then there had been an informal county team, which had played first-class cricket from 1787. Middlesex County Cricket Club has played first-class cricket from 1864, List A cricket from 1963 and Twenty20 cricket from 2003, using a number of home grounds during that time. The Cattle Market Ground in Islington hosted the club's first home fixture in first-class cricket against Sussex in 1864; Lord's in St John's Wood hosted the club's first home List A match against Northamptonshire in 1963; and the club's first home fixture in Twenty20 cricket against Kent in 2003 was at the Old Deer Park in Richmond. Middlesex have played home matches at fourteen grounds, but have played the majority of their home fixtures at Lord's, which also holds Test, One Day International and Twenty20 International cricket matches.

The administrative county of Middlesex ceased to exist in 1965 when its county council was dissolved, and the majority of the county club's grounds are now in Greater London.

Grounds

Below is a complete list of grounds used by Middlesex County Cricket Club for first-class, List A and Twenty20 matches.  Statistics are complete through to the end of the 2014 season.  Only matches played by Middlesex CCC at the grounds are recorded in the table.  Matches abandoned without any play occurring are not included.

Middlesex played a home game against Somerset at the County Ground Chelmsford, Essex in August 1977; the match having been scheduled for the previous week at Lord's but postponed due to a rearrangement of a one-day cup semi-final.

The Middlesex v Notts game on 15/18 July 1939 was played at the Kennington Oval due to rescheduling of games due to the preparations for an imminent war.

Notes
A.  First-class cricket matches are designed to be contested over multiple days, with each team permitted two innings with no limit to the number of overs in an innings.  List A matches are intended to be completed in a single day and restrict each team to a single innings of between 40 and 60 overs, depending on the specific competition.  Twenty20 matches restrict each team to a single innings of 20 overs.

References

Middlesex County Cricket Club
Cricket grounds in Middlesex
Middlesex